William Oxley Thompson is an outdoor 1930 bronze sculpture by Erwin Frey, installed on the Ohio State University campus in Columbus, Ohio, United States.  It depicts the university's former president of the same name.

Description and history
Commissioned in February 1929 and dedicated in June 1930, the statue depicts Thompson wearing academic robes and holding a scroll. Fundraising for the memorial began in 1923, and $13,000 had been raised by 1926. It rests on a New Hampshire granite base with multiple inscriptions.

Harlan Ellison 
Writer Harlan Ellison told Robin Williams during a radio interview, that one of the things which got him expelled from Ohio State was driving up the sidewalk and onto this statue "and who the hell William Oxley Thompson was I'll never gonna be able to tell you."

See also

 1930 in art

References

1930 establishments in Ohio
1930 sculptures
Bronze sculptures in Ohio
Monuments and memorials in Ohio
Ohio State University
Outdoor sculptures in Columbus, Ohio
Sculptures of men in Ohio
Statues in Columbus, Ohio